Bettina Berens (born 2 September 1973) is a German former footballer who played as a midfielder. She made one appearance for the Germany national team in 1992.

References

External links
 

1973 births
Living people
German women's footballers
Women's association football midfielders
Germany women's international footballers
Place of birth missing (living people)